Arash is a long-range radar system built by the Islamic Republic of Iran Air Defense Force. According to Brigadier General Farzad Esmaili, commander of the Islamic Republic of Iran Air Defense Force, Arash radar Phased array radar is complete.
He also said in an interview:«The radar will be developed in the foreseeable future, Radar with very high capacity to detect and identify targets and Also in the field of electronic warfare is approved by the Ayatollah Ali Khamenei.

See also
 Arash the Archer

External links
 Long Range Radar "Arash" operating cycle air defense + pictures

References 

Military radars of Iran